"The Mother" is an episode of the TV anthology series The Philco Television Playhouse.

The episode was highly acclaimed critically.

References

External links
 

1954 American television episodes
Works by Paddy Chayefsky
The Philco Television Playhouse episodes